BBC Radio Leeds is the BBC's local radio station serving the county of West Yorkshire.

It broadcasts on FM, DAB, digital TV and via BBC Sounds from studios at St Peter's Square in Leeds.

According to RAJAR, the station has a weekly audience of 172,000 listeners and a 2.9% share as of December 2022.

History 

The station began broadcasting at the Merrion Centre at 5.30 pm on 24 June 1968, becoming the seventh station to go on air. Initially a two-year experiment and co-funded by Leeds City Council, the station was only available in Leeds on a low powered 50 watt VHF transmitter in Meanwood Park, on 94.6 MHz. Listening figures were very low as at that time, the majority of listeners still listened to radio via AM. In 1970 the station was made permanent and began broadcasting to all of West Yorkshire from the Holme Moss transmitting station and in 1972 the station started broadcasting on MW and branded itself as “the voice of West Yorkshire”.

In 1974, BBC Radio Leeds, along with BBC Look North, moved to new studios in Woodhouse Lane, where it remained for thirty years until the studio was demolished in 2004.

Until the mid 1980s, the station was generally on air from breakfast until teatime, with any programming after 6 pm devoted to specialist music and magazines aimed at specialist interests and at ethnic minority communities. These programmes did not broadcast all year round. 

In August 1986, evening programmes began on a permanent basis when the station joined with the other three BBC stations in Yorkshire to provide an early evening service of specialist music programmes on weeknights from 6pm to 7:30pm, extending a year later to six days a week (Wednesday to Monday) between 7pm and 9pm with Tuesdays reserved for local sports coverage.

In May 1989 the BBC Night Network launched which saw the BBC Local Radio stations in the north of England broadcasting networked programming every evening from 6:05pm (6pm at the weekend) and midnight, with the majority of the programmes broadcast from the Leeds studios. Any local programming broadcast after 6pm, such as sport and ethnic minority output, was transmitted only on medium-wave with Night Network output broadcasting on FM uninterrupted. The network expanded in May 1991 to include the four BBC North West stations and Night Networks hours were changed, starting an hour later, resulting in an additional hour of local output. Programming was overhauled with specialist music programmes airing from 7:05pm to 10pm (the exception being made for midweek sports coverage) followed, on weeknights, by a late show from Lancaster. The late show was extended to 12:30am a year later and eventually to 1am. Local programming would now fully opt-out of the network with any local evening programming replacing the scheduled Night Network programme on both FM and AM.

In the late 1980s and early 1990s the station was branded as "West Yorkshire’s FM BBC Radio Leeds"

In 2002, the Yorkshire stations left the network to introduce a regional phone-in show with Alex Hall, who had hosted a similar show on Pulse.

In 2012, the station closed its offices and studios at the National Media Museum in Bradford, where the public was able to see programmes being broadcast. Radio Leeds also ran district newsrooms and contribution studios in Wakefield Town Hall, at Dean Clough in Halifax and at Huddersfield Town Hall. Four years later, the station reinstated an office and studio in Bradford, located in the Horton building at The University of Bradford.

In order to save money, all local early evening programmes were scrapped at the start of 2013 and they were replaced by a new evening programme which was broadcast on all local stations and the only time that stations were able to not broadcast the programme was to provide local sports coverage. BBC Radio Leeds was the location of the national programme. The late show was a regional programme. The programme continued until summer 2018, almost a year after The Director-General of the BBC, Tony Hall, announced in a speech to mark BBC Local Radio's 50th anniversary that the national evening show would be axed, resulting in local programming returning to weeknight evenings.

BBC Radio Bradford
On 7 December 2020, BBC Radio Bradford began broadcasting as a temporary service on the MW frequency each weekday between 6 am and 2 pm. The service provided eight hours of opt-out programming for listeners in Bradford and the surrounding area each weekday until March 2021.

 Transmitters 

The main VHF/FM transmitter is located at the Holme Moss transmitting station on 92.4 MHz, covering most of West Yorkshire. Unusually, this transmitter also transmits neighbouring services Radio Manchester and Radio Sheffield from separate directional aerials on the mast.

Radio Leeds is also carried on the Wharfedale and Luddenden relay transmitters on 95.3 MHz, from Keighley on 102.7 and from Beecroft Hill (West Leeds) on 103.9 MHz to fill in areas which are screened from Holme Moss by the topology of the area.

Since 2001, BBC Radio Leeds has also been carried on the Bauer Leeds DAB multiplex, and since October 2002, on the Bradford & Huddersfield Multiplex. In addition, the station also broadcasts on Freeview TV channel 719 in the BBC Yorkshire region and streams online via BBC Sounds.

BBC Radio Leeds was also broadcast on MW on 774 kHz from a transmitter located at Farnley. It used to simulcast the BBC Asian Network every evening. MW transmissions ended on 1 June 2021.

 Programming 
Local programming is produced and broadcast from the BBC's Leeds studios from 6am - 1am each day. The late show, airing from 10pm-1am, is simulcast with sister stations BBC Radio Humberside, BBC Radio Lincolnshire (weekdays), BBC Radio Sheffield and BBC Radio York.

During the station's downtime, BBC Radio Leeds simulcasts overnight programming from BBC Radio 5 Live and BBC Radio London.

 Sports coverage 

BBC Radio Leeds broadcasts live sport. Football coverage includes Leeds United, Huddersfield Town and Bradford City. Rugby league coverage includes Leeds Rhinos, Bradford Bulls, Huddersfield Giants, Wakefield Trinity Wildcats and Castleford Tigers. The station covers Yorkshire Carnegie in rugby union and Yorkshire County Cricket Club in cricket.

 Presenters 
Notable current presenters include:

 Pete Allison
 Liz Green
 Andrew Edwards

 Notable former presenters 

Phillip Hayton
John Helm
Stephanie Hirst
Martin Kelner
Peter Levy
Richard Hammond

 Management Managing Editor' Sanjiv Buttoo

References

External links 
 
 The history of BBC Radio Leeds

Radio stations established in 1968
Leeds
Mass media in Leeds
Mass media in Bradford
Radio stations in Yorkshire
Leeds Blue Plaques